The 2004 Canada rugby union tour of Europe was a short series of two matches played in November 2004 in Italy and England by Canada national rugby union team.

Results

Italy: 15.Kaine Robertson, 14.Ludovico Nitoglia, 13.Gonzalo Canale, 12.Andrea Masi, 11.Denis Dallan, 10.Rima Wakarua, 9.Paul Griffen, 8.David dal Maso, 7.Mauro Bergamasco, 6.Aaron Persico, 5.Marco Bortolami (capt.), 4.Santiago Dellapè, 3.Salvatore Perugini, 2.Fabio Ongaro, 1.Andrea Lo Cicero, – replacements: 16.Giorgio Intoppa, 17.Salvatore Costanzo, 18.Enrico Pavanello, 19.Silvio Orlando, 20.Pietro Travagli, 21.Luciano Orquera, 22.Walter Pozzebon 
Canada: 15.Quentin Fyffe, 14.Mike Pyke, 13.John Cannon, 12.Marco di Girolamo, 11.Stirling Richmond, 10.Jared Barker, 9.Ed Fairhurst, 8.Stan McKeen, 7.Mike Webb, 6.Jamie Cudmore , 5.Colin Yukes, 4.Mike Burak, 3.Garth Cooke, 2.Mark Lawson, 1.Kevin Tkachuk, – replacements: 16.Aaron Abrams, 17.Forrest Gainer, 18.Dan Pletch, 19.Josh Jackson, 20.Pat Fleck, 21.Ryan Smith, 22.Derek Daypuck 

England: 15.Jason Robinson (capt.), 14.Mark Cueto, 13.Henry Paul, 12.Mike Tindall, 11.Josh Lewsey, 10.Charlie Hodgson, 9.Andy Gomarsall, 8.Martin Corry, 7.Andy Hazell, 6.Lewis Moody, 5.Steve Borthwick, 4.Danny Grewcock, 3.Julian White, 2.Steve Thompson, 1.Graham Rowntree, – replacements: 16.Andy Titterrell, 17.Andrew Sheridan, 18.Ben Kay, 19.Hugh Vyvyan, 20.Hall Charlton, 21.Will Greenwood, 22.Ben Cohen 
Canada: 15.Derek Daypuck, 14.David Moonlight, 13.Ryan Smith, 12.Marco di Girolamo, 11.Stirling Richmond, 10.Ed Fairhurst, 9.Pat Fleck, 8.Colin Yukes, 7.Stan McKeen, 6.Jamie Cudmore, 5.Mike Burak, 4.Josh Jackson, 3.Forrest Gainer, 2.Aaron Abrams, 1.Kevin Tkachuk (capt.), – replacements: 16.Mark Lawson, 17.Garth Cooke, 18.Dan Pletch, 19.Christoph Strubin, 20.Dave Spicer, 21.John Cannon, 22.Sean O'Leary

References

Canada
tour
Canada national rugby union team tours
tour
tour
Rugby union tours of Italy
Rugby union tours of England